The Turkish Athletic Federation is the governing body for athletics in Turkey.

External links 
 TAF official site

Turkey
Athletic
Federation
Organizations based in Ankara
Sports organizations established in 1922
1922 establishments in the Ottoman Empire
National governing bodies for athletics